Beryozovsky Urban Okrug is the name of several municipal formations in Russia. The following administrative divisions are incorporated as such:
Town of Oblast Significance of Beryozovsky, Kemerovo Oblast
Town of Beryozovsky, Sverdlovsk Oblast

See also
Beryozovsky (disambiguation)

References